Set in Stone may refer to:

Books
 Set in Stone, 2010 thriller novel by Catherine Dunne (writer) 
 Set in Stone (novel), 2006 children's fantasy novel by Linda Newbery

Music
 Set in Stone (Brian McFadden album), 2008
 Set in Stone (Lord album), 2009
 Set in Stone, a Stick Figure album, 2015
 Set in Stone, a Travis Tritt album, 2021
 "Set in Stone" (song), a song by Guy Sebastian, 2016